Alexander Shevchenko or Aleksandr Shevchenko may refer to:

 Alexander Shevchenko (ice hockey) (born 1992), Russian ice hockey player
 Alexander Shevchenko (curler) (born 1971), Russian wheelchair curler
 Alexander Shevchenko (tennis) (born 2000), Russian tennis player
 Alex Shevchenko, co-founder of Grammarly
 Aleksandr Shevchenko (1883–1948), Ukrainian painter

See also
 Oleksandr Shevchenko (disambiguation)